The spotfin croaker (Roncador stearnsii) is a species of croaker occurring from Mazatlán, Mexico, to Point Conception, California, including the Gulf of California. It is the only species in the genus Roncador. In California, they are most commonly found south of Los Angeles Harbor. They live along beaches and in bays over bottoms varying from coarse sand to heavy mud and at depths varying from 4 to 50 feet or more. They prefer depressions and holes near shore.

Description

The body of the spotfin croaker is elongate, but heavy forward. The upper profile of the head is steep and slightly curved, and abruptly rounded at the very blunt snout. The mouth is underneath the head (subterminal). The color is silvery gray with bluish luster above and white below. There are dark wavy lines on the side, and a large black spot at the base of the pectoral fin.

The subterminal mouth, absence of a fleshy barbel and the large black spot at the base of the pectoral fin distinguish spotfin croakers from all other California croakers. Small "spotties" are sometimes confused with small white croakers, but a count of the dorsal fin spines will quickly separate them; the spotfin croaker has 11 or fewer (usually ten), while the white croaker has 12 to 15. So-called "golden croakers" are nothing more than large male spotfin croakers in breeding colors.

Ecology and reproduction 
Spotfin croakers eat a wide variety of food items. As well as clams and worms, small crustaceans are eaten extensively. They use the large pavement-like pharyngeal (throat) teeth to crush their food. The spawning season runs from June to September and may take place offshore, since no ripe fish have been caught in the surf zone. (Juveniles of  appear in the surf in the fall.)

Spotfin croaker travel considerably, but with no definite pattern. They move extensively from bay to bay. For example, fish tagged in Los Angeles Harbor were later taken as far south as Oceanside; spotfin tagged in Newport Bay moved to Alamitos Bay and vice versa.

Fishing information
Although some are caught throughout the year, late summer is best for spotfin croaker fishing. Good fishing seems to depend on runs. When a "croaker hole" is found and a run is on, good fishing can be had by all present whether in a bay, from a pier or in the surf. Most spotfin croaker caught are small to medium-sized fish. The largest recorded specimen was 27 inches, 10.5 pounds.

Here are excerpts on historical spotfin croaker fishing from an article by Ed Reis "Crazy Croakers" in the August 2010 issue of Pacific Coast Sportfishing:

"Croakers do not get much ink in the fishing news these days, but there was a time when they were a major item in newspaper catch reports (in Southern California).  A hundred years ago they were incredibly abundant and drew the attention of many pier and surf fishermen,....

"...Spotfins ... furnished wide-open action when schooled up in "croaker holes" along the beaches or near piers.  I enjoyed some fabulous encounters as a youngster fishing at Santa Monica.  The wooden sand groin nearest the beach home of actress Marion Davies was a productive spot, as were the coastal inlets and estuaries.

"Mission Bay at San Diego was once famous for its spotfin fishing, but since its transformation by dredging and the huge increase in watercraft traffic, there is not much doing with spotfins these days.  In the 1950s I had great luck at Imperial Beach, both in the surf and in the backwater sloughs.  San Onofre was a destination for weekend campers, dedicated to surf fishing in the legendary croaker holes found there.  Newport's bay was also renowned for it croakers. For whatever reason, spotfins are seldom found in San Diego's big bay, and after 11 years of concentrated bay fishing, I have taken only one.

"They favor clams, mussels, and worms for food and grow to over nine pounds in weight.  Large males assume a brassy color during spawning and were called "golden croakers" and thought by some old-timers to be a separate species..."

References
Much of this article is copied from Marine Sportfish Identification: Croakers California Marine Sportfish by the California Department of Fish and Wildlife, Marine Region; a public domain resource.

 Reis, Ed, "Crazy Croakers", Pacific Coast Sportfishing, August 2010

Sciaenidae
Western North American coastal fauna
Fish of the Gulf of California
Fish described in 1876